Per Richard "Dick" Hichens-Bergström (13 August 1913 – 9 May 1989) was a Swedish diplomat.

Early life and family
Hichens-Bergström was born on 13 August 1913 in Stockholm, Sweden, the son of the high councillor Richard Bergström and his wife Jenny (née Glimstedt). He was the brother of the opera singer Margareta Bergström-Karde. His grandfather was a folklorist Richard Bergström, and grandfather was court justice Peter Olof Glimstedt. Per Glimstedt was his uncle.

Career
Hichens-Bergström received a Candidate of Law degree from Uppsala University in 1937 and carried out his clerkship at Södersysslets judicial district from 1937 to 1938. In 1938 he became an attaché at the Ministry for Foreign Affairs and served in San Francisco in 1939, and the year after that in Washington, D.C. where he became legation secretary in 1943. In 1944 Hichens-Bergström became second secretary at the Foreign Ministry, first secretary in 1946, first embassy secretary in Paris in 1948, Bern in 1949, Moscow in 1951 and was acting embassy counsellor there in 1952. He was director at the Foreign Ministry from 1953 to 1956 and deputy head of the political department from 1956 to 1959. He was ambassador in Tehran and Baghdad from 1959 to 1963 and in Kabul from 1960 to 1963. Hichens-Bergström was head of the political department at the Foreign Ministry from 1964 to 1967, envoy in Oslo from 1968 to 1973 as well as in Rome and Valletta from 1973 to 1979.

He had a special assignment for the Swedish National Bank in Washington, D.C. 1941–43 and was representative of the aviation negotiations with the Soviet Union and with other countries 1945–47. Hichens-Bergström was the secretary of the Swedish delegation at the United Nations General Assembly in 1947 and 1948 as well as in the Parliamentary Committee on Foreign Affairs in 1948. He had various missions in Geneva in 1950, 1951, 1954–58 and was the secretary and adviser at the Nordic Foreign Ministers Meetings 1953–56 and 1964–67. During 1953–59 he was a teacher at the Swedish Defence University. Hichens-Bergström was representative of the United Nations General Assembly from 1964 to 1967, an adviser in the 1965 defense investigation, a member of the Advisory Board on Disarmament Matter from 1965 to 1967, chairman of the Swedish delegation at the European Security Conference in Geneva from 1973 to 1974 and was permanent representative of the Food and Agriculture Organization from 1975 to 1979. Hichens-Bergström also had several consulting assignments for the Swedish industry.

Personal life
He was married 1940–61 to Ingrid Bredenberg (1914–2013). In 1961 he married the journalist Marianne Höök (1919–1970) and in 1972 he married Ann Angell-Sandnes. In his first marriage he had the children, Maud (born 1947) and the writer Richard Hichens-Bergström (born 1948).

Death
Hichens-Bergstrom died on 9 May 1989 and was buried on 5 June the same year at Norra begravningsplatsen in Solna Municipality.

Awards
  Knight of the Order of the Polar Star
  Commander with Star of the Order of St. Olav (1 July 1959)
  Commander of the Order of the Dannebrog
  Commander of the Order of the Lion of Finland
  Grand Knight's Cross of the Order of the Falcon (27 June 1957)
  Commander Great Cross of the Order of Homayoun
  Commander of the Order of the Sun of Peru
  Officer of the Order of Orange-Nassau
  Member of the Order of the Phoenix

References

1913 births
1989 deaths
Ambassadors of Sweden to Iran
Ambassadors of Sweden to Iraq
Ambassadors of Sweden to Afghanistan
Ambassadors of Sweden to Italy
Ambassadors of Sweden to Malta
Ambassadors of Sweden to Norway
Uppsala University alumni
People from Stockholm
Knights of the Order of the Polar Star
Commanders of the Order of the Dannebrog
Commanders of the Order of the Lion of Finland
Recipients of the Order of the Falcon
Recipients of the Order of the Sun of Peru
Officers of the Order of Orange-Nassau
Recipients of the Order of the Phoenix (Greece)
Burials at Norra begravningsplatsen